Don Kloetzke (born 1951) is an American painter, known for his wildlife art portraits, he has also painted landscapes, still life, World War II aircraft along with emotional Green Bay Packer fan themes.

Life 
Don was born in Oshkosh, Wisconsin in 1951. His father was in the military so Don moved with his family as they traveled through Hawaii, Mississippi, California, Germany and other places Kloetzke honed his drawing and painting skills.

Kloetzke's work has been accepted by the Leigh Yawkey Woodson Birds in Art Exhibition, an international invitational show.

Awards
His list of accomplishments, honors and awards include:
Wisconsin Sportsman Magazine selected Kloetzke as their first “wildlife Artist of the Year”
Selected as “Sponsor Artist” for the Wisconsin Water fowler's Association.
“Century Artist of the Year” for PBS Channels 10/36.
“Sponsor Artist” for Wings over Wisconsin.
“Midnight at Holy Hill” made the U.S. Art's Best Seller List.
“Sponsor Artist” for Ducks Unlimited.
“A New Beginning” made the U.S. Art's Best Seller List.
Ranked in the top 25 best-selling artists in America by U.S. Art Magazine for three consecutive years, (1993–1995)
“Best of Show” at:
National Art Exhibition of Alaska Wildlife
St. Paul Winter and Wildlife Art Exhibit
National Wildlife & Western Art Exhibition (Milwaukee)
National Wildlife & Western Art Exhibition (Minneapolis)

References

External links
Midnight At Holy Hill

Living people
20th-century American painters
American male painters
21st-century American painters
21st-century American male artists
1951 births
20th-century American male artists